Karbers Ridge is an unincorporated community in Hardin County, Illinois, United States. Karbers Ridge is north of Elizabethtown.

References

Unincorporated communities in Hardin County, Illinois
Unincorporated communities in Illinois